The 1991 Columbus Thunderbolts season was the 1st season for the franchise. They were formed as part of an expansion for 1991. They went 0–10 and  missed the playoffs. They were the second team to complete a winless season in the AFL, the first being the 1989 Maryland Commandos.

Regular season

Schedule

Standings

y – clinched regular-season title

x – clinched playoff spot

Roster

External links
1991 Columbus Thunderbolts at ArenaFan.com

Columbus Thunderbolts
Columbus Thunderbolts
Cleveland Thunderbolts seasons